The Chicago, Milwaukee and St. Paul Passenger Depot, located in Great Falls, Montana, was built in 1915 by the Chicago, Milwaukee, St. Paul and Pacific Railroad (also known as The Milwaukee Road). The Milwaukee Road was the last transcontinental railroad that entered Montana in 1907–1908 as a part of its "Pacific Extension".

The depot is a two-story brick building that includes a 135-foot tower. The building is rectangular in shape. The first floor held the waiting rooms, station agent's office and baggage rooms. Railroad offices were located on the second floor. It was designed by architect J. A. Lindstrand, who also designed the Milwaukee Depot in Missoula, Montana.

The depot continued to serve the local community until the mid-1960s. The Milwaukee Road then ceased passenger service. After the railroad's bankruptcy, the building sat vacant until it was converted into a retail mall in the 1970s. The mall closed in the early 1980s. In 1988, the building was converted into an office building.

References
Wells, Karen A. Chicago, Milwaukee and St. Paul Passenger Depot. National Register of Historic Places Registration Form, National Park Service, Washington, DC, 1988.

Railway stations on the National Register of Historic Places in Montana
Railway stations in the United States opened in 1915
Great Falls, Montana
Buildings and structures in Great Falls, Montana
National Register of Historic Places in Cascade County, Montana
Former railway stations in Montana
Transportation in Cascade County, Montana
1915 establishments in Montana
Mission Revival architecture in Montana
Towers in Montana